Allenypterus is a genus of a prehistoric lobe-finned fish which lived during the Bashkirian stage of the Late Carboniferous period, 318 million years ago). Fossils have been discovered in Bear Gulch Limestone, Montana, USA.

References

External links 
Allenypterus montanus at The Fossil Mall site
Allenypterus at The Palaeos site

Prehistoric lobe-finned fish genera
Hadronectoridae
Pennsylvanian fish of North America